Catherine Black is a Canadian-American actress, director and artist. Black is best known for starring opposite Peter Weller in one episode of the science fiction Showtime series, Odyssey 5, playing Vanden, opposite Christian Bale, in the 2000 cult thriller American Psycho, directed by Mary Harron, and starring with Crispin Glover in the 2009 period drama, The Donner Party. Black won a Best Actress award at the 2014 Madrid International Film Festival for her performance in De Puta Madre A Love Story, a short film that she also wrote and directed. The short film was also nominated for a Best Story and Best Short Film. Black's extensive practice as an actor and artist has rooted her vision in filmmaking. Known for her strong use of color and bold imagery. Catherine is a member of the Alliance of Women Directors.

Life and career 
Catherine Black grew up in Ontario Canada, in Owen Sound, and Brampton, snowmobiling, skiing and training in gymnastics 6 hours a day, 7 days a week. Black spent her teenage years in Toronto, having her stage debut at the age of 16 as Juliet in the production of William Shakespeare's Romeo and Juliet directed by Lewis Baumander. Black went on to star in several Dora Award-winning Theatre productions including Walls of Africa (Theatre Passe Muraille), Crimes (Berkeley Street Theatre-Canadian Stage Company), and The Human Zoo (Factory Theatre Mainspace).

Black has appeared the films and TV series Highlander: The Raven, In a Heartbeat, Blue Murder, Show Me Yours, Loser, Ten for Grandpa, and Stay Cool. Black has studied and performed at the Upright Citizens Brigade, Los Angeles.

The first five directors Catherine worked with were women like Mary Harron and Amy Heckerling, inspiring her to direct one day. She was lucky to shadow many talented directors early in her career, and went on to produce commercials, award winning short films and music videos. Catherine also wrote and directed "Girl Trip", a dark comedy that took home five prestigious awards and just acquired Worldwide distribution-  to be announced. Most recently, Catherine was hired to direct "Like Nothing Happened" that Won Best Drama at the 2021 Rock The Shorts Film Festival.

Black is a classically trained singer who studied at The Royal Conservatory of Music. She is also a self-taught classical painter, and has exhibited her collection, "Benevolence", at The Engine Gallery in Toronto.

References

Further reading 

 Meet Cat Black of Catherine Black in Silverlake
 Remount fever. Two 2001 hits miss the mark

External links

Directed by Catherine Black

Year of birth missing (living people)
Living people
Canadian film actresses
Canadian stage actresses
Canadian television actresses